An answering machine is a device for automatically answering telephone calls and recording messages left by callers.

Answering Machine may also refer to:

Music

Artists
The Answering Machine, a British indie band from Manchester

Albums
The Answer Machine?, by British folk metal band Skyclad
Answering Machine Music (1999), by Casiotone for the Painfully Alone

Songs
"Answering Machine", by The Replacements from the 1984 album Let It Be
"The Answering Machine", by Marillion from the 1998 album Radiation
"Answering Machine", by Cherry Poppin' Daddies from the 1990 album Ferociously Stoned
"Answering Machine", by Rupert Holmes
"Answerphone" (Nicholas McDonald song)
"Answerphone" (Banx & Ranx and Ella Eyre song)
"Answerphone", by David Long, performed by the Mutton Birds
"Ansaphone", performed by Pulp from the single "Disco 2000"

Other uses
Question answering machine